Themba Sibonelo Mtshali is a South African politician who has represented the African National Congress (ANC) in the KwaZulu-Natal Provincial Legislature since 2019. He was ranked 46th on the ANC's provincial party list in the 2019 general election and did not initially secure election to one of the ANC's 44 seats in the legislature; however, he was sworn in shortly after the election, on 17 July 2019, when a casual vacancy arose due to the resignation of Mthandeni Dlungwane.

References

External links 

 
 Hon. TS Mtshali at KwaZulu-Natal Provincial Legislature

Living people
Year of birth missing (living people)
Members of the KwaZulu-Natal Legislature
African National Congress politicians
21st-century South African politicians